Teulisna curviplaga is a moth in the family Erebidae. It was described by Walter Rothschild in 1912. It is found on Peninsular Malaysia and Borneo. The habitat consists of lower montane forests.

References

Moths described in 1912
curviplaga